University of North Bengal (abbreviated as NBU) is a public state collegiate major research university in North Bengal region of West Bengal, which is located in Raja Rammohanpur, Siliguri, Darjeeling district, in the Indian state of West Bengal. A second campus is in Danguajhar, Jalpaiguri in Jalpaiguri district and a third campus is in Salt Lake, Kolkata also in West Bengal. The university was established in 1962 to fill growing manpower needs in the six North Bengal districts and the neighbouring state of Sikkim. North Bengal University offers degrees in undergraduate, post-graduate taught-research, doctorate and post doctoral programs.

History
The University of North Bengal was established by Act of the Legislature of West Bengal in 1962. It was the first university in the region. It served predominantly rural areas in six districts: Darjeeling, Jalpaiguri, Cooch Behar, Maldah, Uttar Dinajpur and Dakshin Dinajpur.

In 2008, the University of Gour Banga was established and almost all the 28 colleges in Maldah, Uttar Dinajpur and Dakshin Dinajpur (with the exception of Raiganj University College) were affiliated to it.

In 2012-13, Cooch Behar Panchanan Barma University was established with all the colleges of Cooch Behar district and Alipurduar subdivision of Jalpaiguri district affiliated with it. The University of North Bengal has jurisdiction over the districts of Darjeeling and Jalpaiguri. It is accredited by NAAC with B++ grade.

Campus
The second campus is in Danguajhar in Jalpaiguri.

The university has an annual enrollment of more than 36,000 undergraduate and more than 1,500 postgraduate students and scholars. Students come from North Bengal mainly from hills and plain areas.
North Bengal University also provide distance education in MA English, Philosophy, Bangla etc.

Organisation and administration

Governance

The Vice-chancellor of the University of North Bengal is the chief executive officer of the university. In 2018 Subiresh Bhattacharya was appointed as Vice-chancellor of the university. In September 2022, followed Bhattacharya arrest, Om Prakash Mishra was appointed interim VC.

Faculties and Departments
University of North Bengal has 30 departments organized into two faculty councils.

 Faculty of Science

This faculty consists of the departments of Anthropology, Mathematics, Physics, Chemistry, Computer Science and Application, Biotechnology, Bioinformatics, Geography and Applied Geography, Pharmaceutical Technology, Microbiology, Geology, Food Technology, Tea Science, Botany, and Zoology.

 Faculty of Arts, Commerce and Law

This faculty consists of the departments of Bengali, English, Hindi, Sanskrit, Nepali, History, Political Science, Philosophy, Education, Economics, Sociology, Library and Information Science, Lifelong Learning and Extension, Mass Communication, Law, Commerce and Management.

Centres
The university offers affiliation to research and academic centres on and off-campus.
University Science & Instrumentation Centre
Computer Centre
Centre for Development Studies
Centre for High Energy & Cosmic Ray
Centre for Remote Sensing Application
Centre for Tea Management
Centre for Mass Communication
Centre for Himalayan Studies
Centre for Women's Studies
Center for Social Research
Centre for Studies in Local Language and Culture
Centre for Tourism and Hotel Management
Centre for Marketing Management
Centre for Ambedkar Studies
Centre for Innovative Studies

Affiliations
The university has several affiliated colleges spread over four districts Alipurduar, Darjeeling, Jalpaiguri, and one sub-division Islampur of North Dinajpur district of North Bengal.

Academics

The University of North Bengal offers three years (B.A./B.Sc./B.Com.) undergraduate degrees and five years B.A. LLB degree on its Law School. It also ofders two-year M.A., M.Com., M.Sc., M.C.A., M.Pharm, two-years MPhil and PhD degrees

Accreditation
In 2016 the university has been awarded 'A' grade with CGPA value 3.05 by the National Assessment and Accreditation Council

Museum

The Akshaya Kumar Maitreya Heritage Museum incorporating the Raja Rajaram Museum Collection was established in the University of North Bengal in February 1965. The museum is now a repository for sculpture, coins, paintings, and manuscripts, among other things, related to the history of North Bengal. It is also a regional museum and is one of the few university museums in India. It collects, preserves and studies archaeological relics discovered regionally.

Notable alumni
Subhasish Dey, hydraulician and educator
Charu Majumdar, founder of the Communist Party of India
Abdul Karim Chowdhury, Former Minister for Mass Education Extension and Library Services in the Government of West Bengal
Mahima Chaudhry, Indian actress and model 
Danny Denzongpa, Indian actor, singer and film director
Jyoti Prakash Tamang, Indian food technologist, microbiologist
Parthasarathi Chakraborty, Indian environmental geochemist, a former senior scientist
 Debkumar Mukhopadhyay, Vice Chancellor of Cooch Behar Panchanan Barma University
Prem Singh Tamang, Chief Minister of Sikkim
Sumana Roy, Indian writer and poet
Bhim Hang Limboo, Minister of Public Health Engineering of Sikkim
Sabina Yeasmin, Indian Cabinet Minister of State
Sourav Chakraborty, Chairman of Siliguri Jalpaiguri Development Authority
Chokila Iyer, India's first female foreign secretary
Sreerupa Mitra Chaudhury, social worker, women's rights activist

See also

References

External links

University Grants Commission
National Assessment and Accreditation Council

 
Educational institutions established in 1962
Universities and colleges in Darjeeling district
Education in Siliguri
Education in Jalpaiguri
1962 establishments in West Bengal
North Bengal
Universities established in the 1960s